Glassy is an adjective meaning, of or resembling glass. Glassy may also mean:

 Glassy, amorphous metal
 Glassy, a 2021 single album, or the title song by Jo Yu-ri
 Glassy phase, amorphous solid
 Glassy water, amorphous ice
 Glassy carbon, carbon with a shiny surface
 Glassy surface, a smooth surface

See also
 Sea glass
 SeaGlass Carousel
 Glass (disambiguation)